Pettersen is a Norwegian patronymic surname which may refer to:

Arne Pettersen (1906–1981), Norwegian sailor
Atle Pettersen (born 1989), Norwegian singer and songwriter, lead singer of the band Above Symmetry
Axel Gunerius Pettersen (born 1925), Norwegian businessperson and politician for the Conservative Party
Axel Pettersen (1864–1928), Norwegian businessperson and politician
Bjarne Pettersen (born 1891), Norwegian gymnast
Britt Pettersen (born 1961), Norwegian former cross country skier
Clarence Pettersen, Canadian politician, elected to the Legislative Assembly of Manitoba in 2011
Egil Pettersen (1922–2010), Norwegian philologist
Erling Pettersen (born 1950), Norwegian lutheran bishop
Espen Bugge Pettersen (born 1980), Norwegian footballer
Georg Pettersen (born 1803) Norwegian politician
Gunerius Pettersen (1826–1892) (1826–1892), Norwegian businessperson
Gunerius Pettersen (1857–1940) (1857–1940), Norwegian businessperson
Gunerius Pettersen (1921) (born 1921), Norwegian businessperson
Gunnar Pettersen (born 1955), Norwegian former team handball player
Harald Pettersen (1869–1937), Norwegian businessperson and politician
Hjalmar Pettersen (1856–1928), Norwegian librarian and bibliographer
Jakob Martin Pettersen (1899–1970), Norwegian politician for the Labour Party
Johannes Pettersen Løkke (1895–1988), Norwegian politician for the Labour Party
Karin Pettersen (born 1964), Norwegian team handball player
Karl Johan Pettersen Vadøy (1878–1965), Norwegian politician for the Liberal Party
Knut Andreas Pettersen Agersborg (1765–1847), Norwegian politician
Kurt Pettersén, Swedish wrestler who competed in the 1948 Summer Olympics
Leif Pettersen (1950–2008), Canadian Football League receiver
Marianne Pettersen (born 1975), Norwegian footballer
Oddrunn Pettersen (1937–2002), Norwegian Minister of Administration and Consumer Affairs in 1989, Minister of Fisheries 1990–1992
Øystein Pettersen (born 1983), Norwegian cross country skier
Rasmus Pettersen (1877–1957), Norwegian gymnast
Sigurd Pettersen (born 1980), Norwegian ski jumper
Steinar Pettersen (born 1945), Norwegian former football and bandy international
Suzann Pettersen (born 1981), Norwegian professional golfer

See also
Pettersen Ridge, ridge extending 11 km north from Sandho Heights in the Conrad Mountains of the Orvin Mountains, Queen Maud Land
Petersen surname page

Norwegian-language surnames
Patronymic surnames